Antennaria rosea is a North American species of flowering plant in the family Asteraceae known by the common name rosy pussytoes. Other common names include cat's foot and mountain everlasting. The second part of its scientific name, rosea, is Latin for pink. It is widespread across much of Canada including all three Arctic territories, as well as Greenland, the western and north-central United States, and the Mexican state of Baja California.

Antennaria rosea is a plant of many habitats, from dry to wet climates and low elevation to very high. It is a very morphologically diverse species; individuals can look very different. It is polyploid and exhibits apomixis; most all the plants are female and they reproduce asexually.

It has a network of short stolons by which it spreads, its method of vegetative reproduction. It forms a basal patch of woolly grayish leaves 1 to 4 cm long. Blooming early in summer, the inflorescence contains several flower heads in a cluster. Each head is lined with wide, pointed phyllaries which are often rose in color, the trait that gives the species its name, but they may also be white, yellowish, or brownish. The species is dioecious, but since most of the individuals are female, most bear flower heads containing pistillate flowers. The fruit is an achene with a body less than 2 millimeters long and a pappus which may be 6 or 7 mm long. The plant often produces fertile seeds, but most individuals in most populations are clones. Plants are sometimes fertilized with pollen from other Antennaria species, which may bring new genes into an A. rosea population, increasing the genetic diversity amongst the clones.

In the UK Antennaria rosea has gained the Royal Horticultural Society's Award of Garden Merit.

Subspecies
Antennaria rosea subsp. arida (E.E.Nelson) R.J.Bayer
Antennaria rosea subsp. confinis (Greene) R.J.Bayer 
Antennaria rosea subsp. pulvinata (Greene) R.J.Bayer
Antennaria rosea subsp. rosea

References

External links

Jepson Manual Treatment
United States Department of Agriculture Plants Profile
Calphotos Photo gallery, University of California
Calflora taxon report, University of California, Antennaria rosea  E. Greene Rosy everlasting,  rose pussytoes, rosy pussytoes 
Southwest Colorado Wildflowers
Dave's Garden
Turner Photographics Wildflowers of the Pacific Northwest
National Park Service, United States Department of the Interior, Native Plant Network, Glacier National Park, Antennaria rosea Greene 

rosea
Plants described in 1898
Flora of North America
Flora of Subarctic America
Flora of Alaska
Flora of the Aleutian Islands
Flora of Greenland
Flora of the Northwest Territories
Flora of Yukon
Flora of Canada
Flora of Eastern Canada
Flora of Labrador
Flora of Newfoundland
Flora of Ontario
Flora of Quebec
Flora of Western Canada
Flora of Alberta
Flora of British Columbia
Flora of Manitoba
Flora of Saskatchewan
Flora of the United States
Flora of the North-Central United States
Flora of Minnesota
Flora of North Dakota
Flora of the Northeastern United States
Flora of Michigan
Flora of the Northwestern United States
Flora of Colorado
Flora of Idaho
Flora of Montana
Flora of Oregon
Flora of Washington (state)
Flora of Wyoming
Flora of the Southwestern United States
Flora of Arizona
Flora of California
Flora of Nevada
Flora of Utah
Flora of the South-Central United States
Flora of New Mexico
Flora without expected TNC conservation status